Papazov Island is the 200 m long in west-southwest to east-northeast direction and 100 m wide rocky island lying off the entrance to Velcha Cove on the east coast of  Astrolabe Island in Bransfield Strait, Antarctica.  It is “named after the Bulgarian-French artist George Papazov (1894-1972).”

Location
German-British mapping in 1996.

Maps
 Trinity Peninsula. Scale 1:250000 topographic map No. 5697. Institut für Angewandte Geodäsie and British Antarctic Survey, 1996.
 Antarctic Digital Database (ADD). Scale 1:250000 topographic map of Antarctica. Scientific Committee on Antarctic Research (SCAR). Since 1993, regularly upgraded and updated.

Notes

References
 Papazov Island. SCAR Composite Gazetteer of Antarctica.
 Bulgarian Antarctic Gazetteer. Antarctic Place-names Commission. (details in Bulgarian, basic data in English)

External links
 Papazov Island. Copernix satellite image

Islands of Trinity Peninsula
Astrolabe Island
Bulgaria and the Antarctic